A Dead Forest Index is a musical project formed by brothers Adam Sherry and Sam Sherry in 2008 in Melbourne, Australia.

History 
Adam and Sam Sherry are originally from New Zealand, writing and performing as a minimalist two-piece, based between Melbourne and London.

In 2012, A Dead Forest Index released an EP entitled Antique with Denovali Records and in 2013 the duo were invited to support the band Savages on a UK tour. Following on from supporting Savages, having caught the attention of Savages’ singer and Pop Noire label co- founder Jehnny Beth, the duo released the EP Cast of Lines with the label Pop Noire in 2014.

The duo released their debut album In All That Drifts from Summit Down with US label Sargent House in 2016 and were invited to support Chelsea Wolfe on a tour of North America.

In 2016, Gemma Thompson, guitarist of the band Savages married Sam Sherry and features on the single Myth Retraced.

In 2017, A Dead Forest Index were invited to collaborate with the Italian dance company Dewey Dell to compose a choral composition inspired by the Sardinian Cantu a tenores. The composition Deriva Traversa was premiered at festivals Danza Urbana in Bologna and Città delle 100 Scale Festival in Matera.

Other projects 
In 2015, A Dead Forest Index collaborated with the band Savages when they were invited to write and perform together as an ensemble alongside choreographer/dance artist Fernanda Muñoz-Newsome for Doug Aitken’s Station to Station Festival at the Barbican. The performance of the piece In What I’m Seeing: The Sun was recorded live onto vinyl.

In 2018, Adam and Sam Sherry formed the trio Unmoor Kiva with Savages’ guitarist Gemma Thompson.

Members 
Adam Sherry - vocals, guitar

Sam Sherry - vocals, percussion

Discography

Collaborative albums 
In What I'm Seeing; The Sun (2015) (with Savages)

References 

Australian folk music groups
Musical groups established in 2008
2008 establishments in Australia
Musical groups from Melbourne